The Ministry of Planning, Budget, and Management (abbreviated MP) is a cabinet-level federal ministry in Brazil. The Ministry was dissolved on 1 January 2019 but recreated on 1 January 2023 with Simone Tebet serving in the position.

See also
List of Ministers of Planning of Brazil

References

External links
 Official site 

Planning, Budget, and Management
Brazil